Authier may refer to:

People 
 Christian Authier (born 1969), French writer and journalist
 Hector Authier (1881–1971), Canadian politician
 Pierre Authier, French car designer

Other uses 
 Authier, Quebec, a municipality in Canada